William Lewis House in Waxahachie, Texas, United States, is a Queen Anne house built in 1888.  It was listed on the National Register of Historic Places in 1986.

It is a two-story asymmetric wood-frame building with weatherboard siding and jig-sawn brackets supporting its roof.  It was listed on the National Register along with many other Waxahatchie properties identified as historic resources in a 1986 study.  The house was deemed to be an "outstanding locally significant representative of Queen Anne" style.

See also

National Register of Historic Places listings in Ellis County, Texas

References

External links

Houses completed in 1888
Houses in Ellis County, Texas
Houses on the National Register of Historic Places in Texas
Queen Anne architecture in Texas
National Register of Historic Places in Ellis County, Texas